Muhammad Zharfan bin Rohaizad (born 21 February 1997) is a Singaporean professional footballer who plays as a goalkeeper for Singapore Premier League club Lion City Sailors and the Singapore national team.

Education 
Zharfan studied at Singapore Sports School.

Club career 
Zharfan started his career with the National Football Academy and was drafted into the LionsXII as cover for the team's recent training camp in Yogyakarta, Indonesia in 2014.

In 2016, Zharfan was drafted to the Garena Young Lions squad and played in the club till 2019.

In 2021, after the Singapore Premier League resumed after the league was suspended due to the COVID-19 pandemic in Singapore, Zharfan signed with Tanjong Pagar United FC.

On 23 December 2022, Zharfan signed with Lion City Sailors FC.

International career 
Zharfan was named Most Valuable Player at the 2015 Vietnam Newspaper Cup tournament.

Zharfan was selected as part of the Singapore Selection squad for The Sultan of Selangor’s Cup held on 24 August 2019.

Zharfan was first called up to the national team in 2019, for the World Cup qualifiers against Yemen and Palestine on 5 September and 10 September respectively.

Career statistics

Club

 Young Lions are ineligible for qualification to AFC competitions in their respective leagues.

Honours

International
Singapore U22
 Merlion Cup: 2019

References

External links 

1997 births
Living people
Singaporean footballers
Association football goalkeepers
Singapore Premier League players
Young Lions FC players
Competitors at the 2017 Southeast Asian Games
Competitors at the 2019 Southeast Asian Games
Singapore youth international footballers
Southeast Asian Games competitors for Singapore